Amphidium is a genus of mosses belonging to the family Orthotrichaceae.

The genus has cosmopolitan distribution.

Species:
 Amphidium aloysii-sabaudiae Negri, 1908 
 Amphidium brevifolium Brotherus, 1913

References

Orthotrichales
Moss genera